Earlton is a hamlet in Greene County, New York, United States. Earlton has a post office with ZIP code 12058, which opened on April 29, 1886.

References

Hamlets in Greene County, New York
Hamlets in New York (state)